The 2022 Liga 3 Central Java or 2022 Counterpain Liga 3 for sponsor reasons, is the fifth season of Liga 3 Central Java organized by Asprov PSSI Central Java.

Persipa Pati is the defending champion after winning it in the 2021 season.

Teams 
2022 Liga 3 Central Java was attended by 39 teams.

First round

Group A

Group B

Group C

Group D

Group E

Group F

Group G

Group H

Group I

Group J

Group K

Group L

Group M

Ranking of runner-up

Second round
The second round matches were held behind closed doors in the following stadiums:
Group N & O: Citarum Stadium, Semarang
Group P & Q: Hoegeng Stadium, Pekalongan
Group R & S: Wergu Wetan Stadium, Kudus

Group N

Group O

Group P

Group Q

Group R

Group S

Ranking of runner-up

Knockout round
If a match is tied after normal playing time, extra time would not be played, and a match would go straight to a penalty shoot-out to determine the winner.

Bracket

Quarter-finals

Semi-finals

Final

References

Liga 3
Sport in Central Java
Liga 3 (Indonesia) seasons